Opgezwolle was a Dutch rap group consisting of MCs Sticky Steez and Phreako Rico, and beatmaker DJ Dippy Delic.

Biography

In 2001 Opgezwolle competed in a contest called "De Oogst van Overijssel". After winning the final in Enschede in May 2001 they got a place in the regional final of the GPNL, and in the summer they recorded their first album Spuugdingen op de Mic.

Opgezwolle made it to the final of the GPNL where they competed with Raymzter. The jury thought that Raymzter made a better impression and he won the contest. DJ Delic got a prize as "Musician of the Evening". On the evening before the GPNL final, they presented Spuugdingen op de Mic in Hedon, Zwolle. The album received overall positive reviews from critics.

In 2002 Opgezwolle began their "Homegrown" Tour. They caught the eye of Dutch label TopNotch and in mid-2002 a record deal was signed for three albums.

On 5 December 2002 they released Opgeduveld, a collaboration between Opgezwolle and the Rotterdam rap group DuvelDuvel (whose members are Duvel, Rein de Vos and Supahdupah). This CD was also well received. In 2005 it was rereleased in both standard and collectors editions.

In 2003, Opgezwolle released Vloeistof/Brandstof, a double-CD, with the second CD being an empty recordable CD. The songs of Brandstof were downloadable from Opgezwolle's website. After performing at many festivals such as Lowlands and the Liberation Day Festival, the initiation of the FC Zwolle Stadion, Planet Rock and the TopNotch Tour, they needed something new and they went back in the recording studio to work with other Dutch MCs like Raymzter, C-mon, Usual Suspects, Duvel, Rein, Pollum, Blabla, Blaxtar, Typhoon and beatmaker Kubus.

On 29 November 2004 the most recent CD of Sticks and Kubus hit the stores, named Microphone Colossus. Sticks named the CD after 'Saxophone Colossus', an album by Sonny Rollins.

The Buitenwesten Tour with Typhoon, Jawat, Kubus and Duvel went all through the Netherlands and was a great success, with many sold out halls.

After a long period of silence from the band, on 23 January 2006 the third Opgezwolle album Eigen Wereld was released. The album features collaborations with other MCs like Pinda, Jawat!, Duvel, Winne en Raymzter. The album contains 21 songs, and almost 70 minutes of music. It reached to number four in the 'Album Top 100', the highest ever chart position of any Dutch rap album. Their tour for this album also received good reviews.

Discography

Spuugdingen op de Mic (2001)
 Mafkezen 
 Bob Sticky
 Verwend 
 Opgezwolle de Volle 
 Ritmen 
 Als die Mic Aanstaat (ft. Typhoon)
 Voor die Peeps (ft. Blaxtar)
 XI (ft. Karlijn)
 Zwolle
 Spuugdingen op die Mic
 't Duurde Even
 Kruidig en Pittig (ft. BlaBla)

Vloeistof (2003)
 Sporen
 Stop
 De Tijd Leert 
 Tempel
 Verre Oosten (Single)
 Vraag & Antwoord (ft. BlaBla)
 Dit is...
 Tjappies & Mammies (Single)
 Dip Saus
 Hook Up (ft. Blaxtar & Typhoon)
 Rustug
 Vork
 Concept of Niet 
 Beestenboel
 Haters en Stokers

Brandstof (2003)
 Hardcore Raps
 Je Weet 't
 Doe je wat je Doet (ft. Kubus)
 Klap
 Skeit
 Waarheid van 't Uur 
 Praten (ft. Duvel)

Eigen Wereld (2006)
 All tracks were produced by Dj Delic
 Hoedenplank (single)
 Werk aan de Winkel
 Balans (ft. Josje & Shyrock)
 Gekkenhuis (ft. Jawat)
 Nagemaakt
 Eigen Wereld
 Elektrostress
 Passievrucht/Bosmuis (ft. Duvel)
 Made in NL
 NL Door 
 Gebleven
 Ut Is Wat Het Is (ft. Raymzter)
 Volle Kracht (ft. Winne)
 Gerrit
 Ukkie
 Vroeger/Nu (ft. James)
 Regendans
 Open Ogen
 Tunnelvisie
 De Jug
 Park (ft. Bert Vrielink)

Collaborations

"Het Kapitalisme" - U-niq (2008)
 Politiek ft. Shyrock

Rayacties - Raymzter (2005)
 Levenslessen

Smookbreeks - Raymzter (2003)
 Smookbreek
 Altijd Laat
 Waar Wou je Heen Gaan
 Verre Oosten
 Skeit (Remix)
 Vloeistof (Remix)

Buitenwesten -  (2004)
 Zwolsche Boys ft. BlaBla
 Strik je Veter
 D-d-d-dikke Gek ft. Jawat
 Buitenbad
 Hamvraag
 Je Kan niet Komen
 Braz-ill

Microphone Colossus -  & Sticks (2004)
 Intro
 Fakkeldrager
 Creatief Proces
 Stickertcampagne
 Hamvraag
 Flows, Fases, Shows, Situaties
 Nix te Verliezen
 Microphone Colossus
 Pottenbrekers
 Zoute Haring
 Biri & Jonko
 Vragen

Ut Zwarte Aap - Jawat (2005)
 Zwarte Koffie
 De Waarheid
 Batterij ft. 

Patta Mixtape - Patta (2005)
 Patta Exclusief 1 ft. Jawat
 Patta Exclusief 4 ft. JJ & Shaa

Opgeduveld - DuvelDuvel (2005)
 Intro
 1001 Sprookjes
 Te Warm
 Dikke Rapper
 Generaal
 Vier Keer Vier
 Zakelijk
 Ze gaan 't Krijgen
 Zonder Handen

Van Aap naar Primaat - DuvelDuvel (2002)
 Pimp Rappers

2e Jeugd - Extince (2004)
 Zure Overval ft. DuvelDuvel, Klopdokter, Raymzter & Kiddo Cee

Cereal - C-Mon (2004)
 Schaapies Tellen

Homegrown 2002 (2002)
 Hersenspinsels
 Netwerk ft. 

Homegrown 2005 (2005)
 Zwarte Koffie ft. Jawat
 Volle Vrijheid ft. 

Alle 18 Dope (2002)
 Netwerk

Vet Verse Flows (2003)
 Het Doek Valt ft. Typhoon

Other work

(not published on an album)

 Dodelijke Collabo ft. DRT  
 Haat/Dat Ding Dat ik Doe
 Gestolen Flow 
 Veel te Ver (Jakarta project track Pakabar)
 Hallo
 A.B.C. ft. Kubus
 Halfbloed ft. Kubus
 Vakman ft. Kubus
 Stickstof ft. Kubus 
 Volle Vrijheid ft. Kubus 
 Een Beetje Vertieft ft. Raymzter & Kubus 
 Pittige Toegift ft. Typhoon
 Laat Het een Les Zijn ft. loic 
 Biet 4 Brian

External links
 Official website
 Complete biography
 Free video of the entire Paradiso concert (02-12-2006)

Info From
 :nl:Opgezwolle

Dutch hip hop groups